Mount Jefferson may refer to:

List of peaks named Mount Jefferson
Mount Jefferson (Bitterroot Range), mountain in both Fremont County, Idaho and Beaverhead County, Montana
Mount Jefferson (Massachusetts)
Mount Jefferson (Maine)
Mount Jefferson (Madison County, Montana)
Mount Jefferson (North Carolina)
Mount Jefferson (New Hampshire)
Mount Jefferson (Nevada)
Mount Jefferson (New York)
Mount Jefferson (Oregon)
Mount Jefferson (Virginia)
Mount Jefferson, Ohio, unincorporated community in Loramie Township, Shelby County, Ohio